In mathematics, a Conway algebra, introduced by  and named after John Horton Conway, is an algebraic structure with two binary operations | and * and an infinite number of constants a1, a2,..., satisfying certain identities. Conway algebras can be used to construct invariants of links that are skein invariant.

References

Knot theory
John Horton Conway